Sandy Shaw may refer to:

 Sandy Shaw (writer) (born 1943), American writer on health
 Sandy Shaw (politician) (born 1960), Canadian politician

See also
 Sandie Shaw (born 1947), English singer